Mario Paolucci (September 15, 1941 - July 12, 2008) was an Argentine film actor.

Paolucci was born in Buenos Aires.  Active since 1996, he appeared in over 20 films in the Cinema of Argentina, and has appeared in a number of acclaimed films by director Alejandro Agresti. Paolucci made his debut in Buenos Aires vice versa in 1996 and has also appeared in Una noche con Sabrina Love, (2000) with Cecilia Roth, the short film of Marcelo Schapces "Dónde estaba Dios cuando te fuiste" (1997) and La Fuga in 2001 with Gerardo Romano. In 2006 he appeared in the comedy El Boquete.  He died, aged 66, in Lomas de Zamora, Gran Buenos Aires.

Filmography
 Los cuentos de Fontanarrosa (2007) TV series.... as Bramuglia 
 El infinito sin estrellas (2007).... as Cosme 
 Remake (2006).... as Max 
 El Boquete (2006) 
 Un peso, un dolar (2006).... as Vicente 
 Tatuado (2005).... as Viejo 
 Padre Coraje (2 episodes, 2004) 
 In Evil Hour (2004).... as Comandante 
 Informe nocturno (2004) 
 En la oscuridad (2004) 
 Cleopatra (2003) 
 La cruz del sur (2003).... as Rodolfo  
 Chicas rollinga (2003) 
 Los porfiados (2002).... as Dino Scarfo 
 Un día de Suerte (2002).... as Arístides 
 La fuga (2001).... as Carcelero 
 La granja (2001) 
 Western Coffee (2001) 
 Una noche con Sabrina Love (2000).... as Carmelo  
 Caminata espacial (2000) 
 El planeta de los hippies (1999) 
  (1998)  
 El milagro secreto (1998) 
 Un día para siempre (1997) 
 Buenos Aires Vice Versa (1996)

External links
 

1941 births
2008 deaths
Argentine male film actors
People from Buenos Aires